Kirsty Feasey (born 7 February 1993) is a former footballer who played as a defender. Born in England, she represented the Malta national team.

References

1993 births
Living people
Women's association football defenders
People with acquired Maltese citizenship
Maltese women's footballers
Malta women's international footballers
Maltese people of British descent
Birkirkara F.C. (women) players
English women's footballers
Sportspeople from Reading, Berkshire
English people of Maltese descent
Reading F.C. Women players
Footballers from Berkshire